The Mayor of Penang Island is the chief executive for the local government of George Town, the capital of the State of Penang and Malaysia's third largest city. The Mayor's responsibilities include the management of the Penang Island City Council's annual budget, which amounts to RM606.53 million .

Chronological list

Mayor of George Town 
Between 1957 and 1966, the city of George Town, under the governance of the George Town City Council, was led by three Mayors.

In 1966, the functions of the George Town City Council were taken over by the then Chief Minister of Penang, Wong Pow Nee.

Mayor of Penang Island 
To date, the Penang Island City Council has been headed by three successive mayors.

Patahiyah Ismail, who became the first female Mayor of Penang Island in 2015, held the position until 2017, when she was succeeded by Maimunah Mohd Sharif. However, Maimunah's tenure as the Mayor of Penang Island lasted for only a year, following her concurrent appointment as the Executive Director of the United Nations Human Settlements Programme by the Secretary-General of the United Nations, António Guterres; Maimunah thus became the first Asian to be elected for the role. Yew Tung Seang was subsequently appointed as the third Mayor of Penang Island, with his term beginning in 2018.

See also 
 Penang Island City Council

References 

Penang Island
Lists of political office-holders in Malaysia
Local government in Penang